AS Saint-Etienne won Division 1 season 1956/1957 of the French Association Football League with 49 points.

Participating teams

 Angers SCO
 RC Lens
 Olympique Lyonnais
 Olympique de Marseille
 FC Metz
 AS Monaco
 FC Nancy
 OGC Nice
 Nîmes Olympique
 RC Paris
 Stade de Reims
 Stade Rennais UC
 AS Saint-Etienne
 UA Sedan-Torcy
 FC Sochaux-Montbéliard
 RC Strasbourg
 Toulouse FC
 US Valenciennes-Anzin

Final table

Promoted from Division 2, who will play in Division 1 season 1957/1958
 Olympique Alès: Champion of Division 2
 AS Béziers: runner-up
 Lille OSC: Third place

Results

Top goalscorers

References
 Division 1 season 1956-1957 at pari-et-gagne.com

Ligue 1 seasons
French
1